Petre Purima (born 21 January 1951) is a Romanian former footballer who played as a left defender. In 2003 Purima received the Honorary Citizen of Craiova title.

Honours
Universitatea Craiova
Divizia A: 1979–80, 1980–81
Cupa României: 1976–77, 1977–78, 1980–81

References

External links
Petre Purima at Labtof.ro

1951 births
Living people
Romanian footballers
Romania youth international footballers
Romania under-21 international footballers
Association football defenders
Liga I players
Liga II players
CS Universitatea Craiova players
FC UTA Arad players
CS Gaz Metan Mediaș players
People from Mediaș